The Lister Hospital is an NHS hospital based on the outskirts of Stevenage in Hertfordshire. It is operated by the East and North Hertfordshire NHS Trust along with the New QEII Hospital in Welwyn Garden City.

History
Prior to 1972 there was a Lister Hospital in Hitchin. Like the present hospital, it was named in honour of Joseph Lister, 1st Baron Lister, a British surgeon known as the pioneer of aseptic surgery, 
The new hospital was opened by Queen Elizabeth The Queen Mother in 1972. With an investment of around £150 million, the Lister hospital was transformed in October 2014.

Operations
The Lister Hospital currently has 730 beds and is a general hospital, which includes accident and emergency, urology and renal dialysis units.

See also
 List of hospitals in England
 Enhance Herts

References

External links
NHS Choices - Lister hospital page 
East and North Hertfordshire NHS Trust

Hospital buildings completed in 1972
Hospitals in Hertfordshire
Stevenage